The third cabinet of Dimitrie A. Sturdza was the government of Romania from 14 February 1901 to 20 December 1904.

Ministers
The ministers of the cabinet were as follows:

President of the Council of Ministers:
Dimitrie A. Sturdza (14 February 1901 - 20 December 1904)
Minister of the Interior: 
Petre S. Aurelian (14 February 1901 - 18 July 1902)
Gheorghe Pallade (18 July 1902 - 22 November 1903)
Vasile Lascăr (22 November 1903 - 13 December 1904)
(interim) Spiru Haret (13 - 20 December 1904)
Minister of Foreign Affairs: 
Dimitrie A. Sturdza (14 February 1901 - 9 January 1902)
(interim) Ion I.C. Brătianu (9 January - 18 July 1902)
Ion I.C. Brătianu (18 July 1902 - 12 December 1904)
(interim) Dimitrie A. Sturdza (12 - 20 December 1904)
Minister of Finance:
Gheorghe Pallade (14 February 1901 - 9 January 1902)
Dimitrie A. Sturdza (9 January - 18 July 1902)
Emil Costinescu (18 July 1902 - 20 December 1904)
Minister of Justice:
Constantin I. Stoicescu (14 February 1901 - 18 July 1902)
Eugeniu Stătescu (18 July 1902 - 19 October 1903)
Alexandru Gianni (19 October 1903 - 20 December 1904)
Minister of War:
(interim) Dimitrie A. Sturdza (14 February 1901 - 18 July 1902)
Dimitrie A. Sturdza (18 July 1902 - 20 December 1904)
Minister of Religious Affairs and Public Instruction:
Spiru Haret (14 February 1901 - 20 December 1904)
Minister of Agriculture, Industry, Commerce, and Property:
Basile M. Missir (14 February 1901 - 18 July 1902)
Petre S. Aurelian (18 July - 14 November 1902)
(interim) Dimitrie A. Sturdza (14 - 22 November 1902)
Constantin I. Stoicescu (22 November 1902 - 20 December 1904)
Minister of Public Works:
Ion I.C. Brătianu (14 February 1901 - 18 July 1902)
Constantin I. Stoicescu (18 July - 22 November 1902)
(interim) Dimitrie A. Sturdza (22 November 1902 - 14 November 1903)
Emanoil Porumbaru (14 November 1903 - 20 December 1904)

References

Cabinets of Romania
Cabinets established in 1901
Cabinets disestablished in 1904
1901 establishments in Romania
1904 disestablishments in Romania